The  Middleton-Cross Plains School District  is a public school district in Dane County, Wisconsin, United States, based in Middleton, Wisconsin.

Schools
The Middleton-Cross Plains School District has seven elementary schools, two middle schools, one high school and one alternative senior high school.

Elementary schools
Elm Lawn Elementary School
Park Elementary School
Pope Farm Elementary School
Northside Elementary School
Sauk Trail Elementary School
Sunset Ridge Elementary School
West Middleton Elementary School

Middle schools
Glacier Creek Middle School
Kromrey Middle School

High schools
 Clark Street Community School
Middleton High School

References

External links

Middleton Alternative Senior High

Education in Dane County, Wisconsin
School districts in Wisconsin